Peter Clark Johnson (born January 4, 1950) is an American sports executive.

Early life and education
Johnson was born in Milwaukee, Wisconsin and was raised in Bryn Mawr, Pennsylvania. He went to high school at Penn Charter in Philadelphia and attended the University of Delaware, where he was a member of the 1971 National Champion Division I-AA Football team. After graduating, he played in the NFL for the Buffalo Bills and Detroit Lions. Johnson received his MBA from the Wharton School of the University of Pennsylvania.

Career
In 1976, Johnson started his career at IMG, the world's largest sports, entertainment and media company, where he worked for thirty years. He was the COO, and then the CEO - Sports and Entertainment. At the time, IMG had 3,000 employees in 70 offices in 35 countries.

In 2004, Sports Business Journal named Johnson the Most Influential Agent in Sports. Advertising Age named him the "Top Marketer". In 2005, Sports Business Journal named him the #25 Most Powerful Person in Sports.

Clients
Over the course of his career, Johnson has represented three NFL MVPs, the #1 ranked players in both men's and women's tennis, the #1 ranked women's golfer as well as the World Heavyweight Boxing champion.

In the early part of his IMG career, he was a player agent and his personal clients included the following:
 Joe Montana
 Peyton Manning
 Herschel Walker
 Rich Gannon
 Ivan Lendl
 Martina Navratilova
 Nancy Lopez
 Evander Holyfield
 Shane Mosley

Johnson hired and trained dozens of top executives including Tom Condon and Pat Brisson of CAA Sports as well as Casey Close, Jeff Schwartz and Alan Zucker of Excel Sports Management.

Personal life
Johnson lives in Cleveland, Ohio and is married to former IMG executive Stephanie Tolleson.

References

External links
 Bloomberg

1950 births
Living people
American sports agents
Players of American football from Milwaukee
People from Bryn Mawr, Pennsylvania
Delaware Fightin' Blue Hens football players
Wharton School of the University of Pennsylvania alumni